Sébastien Gimenez (born 21 March 1974) is a French football coach and former professional footballer who is a goalkeeping coach for the Monaco under-19 team.

Playing career
Gimenez mainly played football at the lower level for Castelnau Le Crès and Arles, before moving to Sète in 2005, a club which had recently won promotion to Ligue 2. He made his professional debut for Sète on 13 January 2006, replacing injured starter Olivier Labruna in the 22nd minute of a 2–0 home loss to Lorient. This remained his only professional appearance.

Coaching career
Following his retirement at the end of the 2009–10 season as part of Nîmes, Gimenez remained with Nîmes and becaming goalkeeping coach on Jean-Michel Cavalli's coaching staff. He remained in this position until 2022, where he became goalkeeping coach for the Monaco under-19s.

References

External links
 

1974 births
Living people
Sportspeople from Avignon
French footballers
Ligue 2 players
Championnat National players
Championnat National 2 players
Championnat National 3 players
Castelnau Le Crès FC players
AC Arlésien players
FC Sète 34 players
Nîmes Olympique players
Association football goalkeepers
Association football goalkeeping coaches
Nîmes Olympique non-playing staff
AS Monaco FC non-playing staff